Restoration of the Chechen-Ingush autonomy by decrees of the Presidiums of the Supreme Soviets of the USSR and the RSFSR on January 9, 1957, the Chechen-Ingush ASSR was restored, and within slightly different boundaries than when abolished; Naursky and Shelkovskaya districts with a predominantly Russian population transferred in 1944 from the Stavropol Territory to the Grozny Region remained in its composition, but the Prigorodny District, which remained in North Ossetia, was not returned to it. The area of the republic after the restoration was 19,300 km². At the same time, the Chechen-Ingush population was forbidden to live in the southern mountainous regions of the republic adjacent to the Georgian SSRGo to the section «Socio-territorial changes».

On February 11, 1957, the Supreme Soviet of the USSR approved the decree of its Presidium of January 9 and returned the mention of autonomy to Article 22 of the USSR Constitution.
 
Due to the ill-conceived and inconsistent implementation of the decree, as well as the resistance of part of the party-Soviet nomenklatura in the center and in the field, the restoration process dragged on, was fraught with many difficulties and created new problems. The restoration of the republic launched the process of the outflow of the Russian and Russian-speaking population from the region and led to a sharp aggravation of interethnic relations.

History 
On February 23, 1944, the Chechens and Ingush were deported. In 1948, by a special resolution of the Council of Ministers of the USSR, it was confirmed that the Chechens and Ingush were deported «forever». After the death of Stalin and the execution of Beria, the deported peoples had hope for rehabilitation and return to their homeland. Well-known representatives of the repressed peoples (writers, scientists, executives, retired officers) and ordinary citizens began to persistently apply to the authorities with their requests, the main of which was to immediately return the deported peoples and remove charges of collaborationism from them.

An important role in the restoration of the CHIASSR was played by several public figures Abdurakhman Avtorkhanov, Muslim Gairbekov, Magomed Shataev.

See also 
 History of Chechnya
 Deportation of the Chechens and Ingush

References

Further reading 
 
 
 
 
 Chenchieva M. Kh. Revival of the Motherland // Archival Bulletin: journal. — 2016. — No. 4. — S. 154—169.

History of Chechnya
History of Ingushetia
History of the Caucasus under the Soviet Union